The 22633 / 22634 Thiruvananthapuram Central–Hazrat Nizamuddin Express is a Express train belonging to Indian Railways – Southern Railway zone that runs between  and  in India.

It operates as train number 22633 from Thiruvananthapuram Central to Hazrat Nizamuddin and as train number 22634 in the reverse direction, serving the states of Kerala, Karnataka, Goa, Maharashtra, Gujarat, Madhya Pradesh, Rajasthan, Uttar Pradesh, Haryana & Delhi.

Coaches

The 22633 / 22634 Thiruvananthapuram Central–Hazrat Nizamuddin Express have 1 AC 2 tier, 6  AC 3 tier, 10 Sleeper class 3 tier, 4 General Unreserved & 2 EOG (Seating cum Luggage Rake) coaches. It does not carry a pantry car.

As it is customary with most train services in India, coach composition may be amended at the discretion of Indian Railways depending on demand.

Service

Routeing

The 22633 / 22634 Thiruvananthapuram Central–Hazrat Nizamuddin Express runs from Thiruvananthapuram Central via 

Traction

References

External links
22633 Thiruvananthapuram Hazrat Nizamuddin Superfast Express at India Rail Info
22634 Hazrat Nizamuddin Thiruvananthapuram Superfast Express at India Rail Info

Transport in Delhi
Transport in Thiruvananthapuram
Express trains in India
Rail transport in Kerala
Rail transport in Karnataka
Rail transport in Goa
Rail transport in Maharashtra
Rail transport in Gujarat
Rail transport in Rajasthan
Rail transport in Delhi
Railway services introduced in 2014
Rail transport in Madhya Pradesh
Rail transport in Haryana